FC Uijeongbu (Korean: FC 의정부) was a South Korean amateur football club based in Uijeongbu, South Korea. They played in the K3 League Basic, fifth tier of the South Korean football league system.

History

Founding
According to their website plans were first set in action to form the club in March 2013, and in the same month the clubs constitution was published. The club founding was announced on 6 October 2013 when the mayor of Uijeongbu signed the club into existence as a citizens club. then On 29 March 2014, Club was officially founded.

Entry into the league system
Under former Korean national team manager Kim Hee-Tae (Korean: 김희태), the club held an open trial on 22 October 2013. 34 players attended and the club selected 20. They also shortlisted 10 players from other club where their contracts were due to expire. From the 2014 season, the team started to play in the Challengers League, currently called K3 League.

Team Colours
The official uniform has not been shown yet.

Players

Current team

Honours

Season by season records

References

External links
 Official website  

K3 League (2007–2019) clubs
Sport in Gyeonggi Province
Association football clubs established in 2013
Uijeongbu
2013 establishments in South Korea